Moolakaraipatti is a Panchayat town in Tirunelveli district in the Indian state of Tamil Nadu.

Location
Located in Tirunelveli District of Tamil Nadu, Moolaikaraipatti is a prominent 'panchayat town'.  It is situated in the south of Tirunelveli at a distance of 22 km, in the east of Munradaippu at a distance of 10 km, and 15 km. from Nanguneri.

Demographics
 India census, Moolakaraipatti had a population of 9484. Males constitute 48% of the population and females 52%. Moolakaraipatti has an average literacy rate of 70%, higher than the national average of 59.5%: male literacy is 76%, and female literacy is 64%. In Moolakaraipatti, 12% of the population is under 6 years of age.
Moolaikaraipatti is one of the famous town panchayat in tirunelveli district

Economy

Agriculture plays a Vital role in the District's economy. The important food crops are Paddy, Cholam, Ragi, Cumbu Maize and other minor millets.  The commercial crops are Cotton, Chillies, Sugarcane and Groundnut. 
Agriculture is the main income. Rice, dal, pies, tapioca, plantains, sweet potato, vegetables, are produced. Cattle rearing and Milk produce are also a business here.

Transportation 
The nearest railway station is the Nanguneri Railway Station and the Tuticorin Airport at a distance of 31 km.

Bus
Moolaikaraipatti has connectivity from several places like Tirunelveli, Tirunelveli Junction, Sathankulam, Thisayanvilai, Nanguneri, Udangudi, Aathoor, Athankarai Palli Vasal and Periyathalai''.

Education

Ramana Polytechnic College   
The college provides technical education to the rural youths. The institution has introduced the technical courses of Civil, Mechanical, Electrical and Electronics, Electronics and Communication, Computer Engineering

Schools

The Following schools are available in moolaikaraipatti.

 Government Higher Secondary School. 
 Reach Matric Higher Secondary School .
 Panchayat Union Primary School.
 Sakthi Matriculation School.
 Vyasa Vidyalaya Primary and Nursery School.
Government higher secondary School (Kadambankulam) 
Government primary school (Kadambankulam)

References

Cities and towns in Tirunelveli district